"6 Underground" is a song by the English band Sneaker Pimps from their debut studio album Becoming X. First released as a single in the United Kingdom in September 1996, the song reached number 15 on the UK Singles Chart and had moderate radio airplay in the United States, where it was shipped to modern rock and dance stations in February 1997. After the song was used in the 1997 American film The Saint, radio stations began playing "6 Underground" more frequently. The single was re-released in May 1997, when it peaked at number nine on the UK Singles Chart. In the United States, the song peaked at number 45 on the Billboard Hot 100 and at number seven on the Billboard Modern Rock Tracks chart.

The cover artwork of the single uses a photograph of a Lego Space moonscape. The piece is from the Command Centre playset marketed by The Lego Group from 1978 to 1988. After the commercial success and popularity of the album version of the song, the group released several remixes, some of which became hits in dance clubs and radio stations with a dance format. The version most frequently heard on radio was the remix by Nellee Hooper (which appeared as a hidden track on the album).

Composition
The horns and the harp melody at the beginning of the song are both sampled from "Golden Girl", a track from the 1964 James Bond film Goldfinger (the song plays during a scene when Bond discovers Jill Masterson covered in gold paint). The "a-one two" heard repeatedly in the Nellee Hooper version is sampled from De La Soul's song "Breakadawn".

Chris Corner said, "It's about death in a small town environment. You grow up in this shit town and you yearn to get out. A lot of artists, we just can't survive in a place like that. So, the essence of that song is that living in a small town is like dying. For us it was a huge release to get out and to explore the world, to see what everything else is about. We all wanted that. You know, the northern industrial shithole. And that's really what that song's about."

Music video
The music video for the song was directed by Toby Tremlett, and made its debut on 14 January 1997. Throughout the video, which gives off a dark atmosphere, the camera focuses on Kelli Dayton singing in the middle of a dark room sitting in a dentist chair that she spins around. The camera follows Dayton as she slowly walks around the darkened room singing the song. There are also several smaller lit rooms with oval windows within the larger dark room, depicting different scenes such as a man dressed in black practicing various poses, a woman dressed in a nightgown who is vacuuming the floor, a young woman posing around a chair in a red tie shirt and black skirt, a toddler dressed in a costume pouring spaghetti from a jar and tossing it around the room, and an overweight man eating spaghetti while sitting in a recliner. The small rooms with the oval windows could depict a view into people's private lives, and even a view into their souls. A can of worms is poured out by a band member. The other band members are usually seen lurking behind Dayton in this video, including in some scenes where the band is standing in one of the small, brightly lit rooms. At the end of the video, the people in the smaller rooms seem to freeze in place, and in the big room, the band poses at Dayton's dentist chair, and then the lights go out.

The video uses the Nellee Hooper edit of the song. Laura Prepon of That '70s Show was also featured in the video.

Track listings
UK CD single
 "6 Underground" (Nellee Hoopers edit) – 3:54
 "6 Underground" (album version) – 4:05
 "Can't Find My Way Home" – 6:04
 "Precious" – 4:18

UK 12-inch single
 "6 Underground" (Two Lone Swordsmen vocal mix) – 5:47
 "6 Underground" (Nellee Hooper's dub) – 4:28
 "6 Underground" (In the Jungle mix) – 7:58
 "Can't Find My Way Home" – 6:07

Charts

Release history

Usage in media
The song is featured at the beginning of the Beverly Hills, 90210 episode "Friends in Deed" from its eighth season. A remix of the song — "Six Underground (The Umbrellas Of Ladywell Mix #2)" — is used in the 1998 teen film Can't Hardly Wait, when character Amanda Beckett (Jennifer Love Hewitt) first walks into the party. In 2000, the song is the main theme for the US primetime soap opera Titans. In 2014, the song is used for the enhanced version of the popular video game Grand Theft Auto V on the radio station Non-Stop-Pop FM. The song is also featured in The Watcher (2000), a movie starring James Spader and Keanu Reeves.

References

1996 singles
1996 songs
1997 singles
Sneaker Pimps songs
Song recordings produced by Jim Abbiss
Songs with music by John Barry (composer)
Songs written by Chris Corner
Songs written by Liam Howe
Virgin Records singles